Unleashed... is a live album by The Dogs D'Amour, released June 13, 2006. It was recorded at the Robin 2 in Wolverhampton, England, the hometown of the band's leader, Tyla. The album features none of the most well known classic line up band members.

Track listing
All songs written by Tyla.
 "Get By"
 "Last Bandit"
 "I Don't Want You to Go"
 "Never Give Up"
 "Heroine"
 "Roll Over"
 "Only Girl I Ever Loved"
 "All of Them Great"
 "Bloody Mary"
 "Drunk Like Me"
 "What You Do"
 "How Come It Never Rains"
 "Firework Girl"
 "Errol Flynn"
 "Satellite Kid"

Credits
 Tyla: Lead Vocals, Guitar, Bass
 Yella: Backing Vocals
 Tom Spencer: Guitar, Backing Vocals
 Rich Jones: Guitar, Backing Vocals
 Mark Stanway: Keyboards
 Simon Hansen: Drums

The Dogs D'Amour albums
2006 live albums

it:Double Eclipse
fi:Double Eclipse